The Orlando Open is a professional tennis tournament played on hard courts. It is currently part of the ATP Challenger Tour. It is held annually in Orlando, Florida, United States since 2019.

Past finals

Singles

Doubles

References

ATP Challenger Tour
Hard court tennis tournaments
Tennis tournaments in Florida
Sports competitions in Orlando, Florida
2019 establishments in Florida
Recurring sporting events established in 2019